Meridarchis jumboa is a moth in the Carposinidae family. It was described by Kawabe in 1980. It is found in Japan.

References

Natural History Museum Lepidoptera generic names catalog

Carposinidae
Moths described in 1980